Bălan is a town in Harghita County, Transylvania, Romania. It has historically been one of Transylvania and Romania's most important centers for copper mining, but its mines are no longer operational. Its Romanian name means "blond", the German name means "copper mine" while the Hungarian name means "Balán mine".

Geography
The town lies in the Ciuc Depression (Romanian Depresiunea Ciucului). It is surrounded by the Hășmaș Mountains (Hășmașul Mare and Hășmașul Mic). Bălan is crossed by the Olt River.

Climate
There are 1,300–1,400 sunny hours per year. Wind gusts are rare due to the surrounding mountains and forests.

Flora and fauna
Most of the forests around Bălan are spruce forests, but there are also fir, larch and maple forests. There are some flowers species in the area like edelweiss and sweet pea which are protected by law. In the forests there are some edible mushrooms species and fruits like blueberries, raspberries and cranberries.

Demographics

According to the census from 2011 the town had a population of 5,864 of which 3,625 (61.82%) were Romanians, and 2,124 (36.22%) were Hungarians.

History
Bălan was the site of iron mining during the 17th century, but by 1702 the iron stores had been depleted. The copper deposits were discovered in 1785 by János Opra; production began in 1803, and by 1853 six mines were in operation. From that period, the village gradually began to develop into a town. Until 1967, Bălan remained part of the commune of Sândominic, finally gaining official town status in 1968. In 2006 all mining-related activities were stopped by the Romanian government and nowadays the city is counting on ecotourism and small businesses as main economical activities.

Points of interest
Bălan's main architectural site is the Roman Catholic Church, consecrated in 1869. Despite the environmental blight of the mining, the surrounding area is uncommonly beautiful, taking in the nearby mountains of Hășmașul Mare and Tarcău, the former a popular hiking destination. The river Olt, one of Romania's most significant, originates in the mountains near the town.

References

Towns in Romania
Populated places in Harghita County
Localities in Transylvania
Mining communities in Romania
Monotowns in Romania